Sztuka i Naród (Art and Nation) was a Polish monthly published covertly in Warsaw, occupied Poland during World War II. It was supported by the resistance group Konfederacja Narodu. It was published from April 1942 to Warsaw Uprising in August 1944. 16 issues were published. It was the only Polish underground publication, dedicated to cultural matters, that was regularly published for such a long period of time.

Editors-in-chief:
Bronisław Onufry Kopczyński (ps. "Stefan Barwiński") – arrested in January 1943, died in April that year
Wacław Bojarski (ps. "Jan Marzec", "Wojciech Wierzejewski", "Marek Zalewski") - wounded in May 1943, died in June that year
Andrzej Trzebiński (ps. "Stanisław Łomień", "Paweł Późny") - Arrested and executed in October 1943
Tadeusz Gajcy (ps. "Karol Topornicki", "Roman Oścień") - till the last issue, died in the Warsaw Uprising

Most of activists of SiN were related to the underground Warsaw University. Notable writers publishing in SiN included: Bernard Wojciech Mencl, Zdzisław Leon Stroiński, Stanisław Marczak-Oborski, Jerzy Zagórski and Lesław Marian Bartelski.

The magazine supported the radical and national philosophies, and was critical of some pre-war trends; in particular, it criticized the Skamander group of Polish writers.

Notes

Further reading
Małgorzata Bartyzel, Sztuka i Naród w Wielkim Teatrze Świata, Marszałek, 2007, 

1942 establishments in Poland
1944 disestablishments in Poland
Defunct literary magazines published in Poland
Poland in World War II
Magazines established in 1942
Magazines disestablished in 1944
Magazines published in Warsaw
Monthly magazines published in Poland
Polish-language magazines
Polish underground press in World War II